Empowering Women in Organic Chemistry (EWOC) is a scientific conference designed to bring the research and career interests of women in organic chemistry to the forefront and seeks to empower all marginalized individuals by promoting equity, justice, diversity, and inclusion across all chemistry fields. EWOC is the world's largest gathering of women in organic chemistry, and hosts an annual meeting of women (students, post-docs, faculty and professionals) who work or plan to work in the field of Organic Chemistry, broadly defined, from all types of institutions (academic, industry, biotech, non-profit and government).  

The meeting goals are to

Establish a peer group network for collaborating and recruiting diverse talent
 Afford a novel mechanism to provide advice and counsel for women organic chemists
 Share stories from different perspectives about career development and challenges faced – and overcome – along the way
 Establish an inclusive community, with an emphasis on Diversity, Inclusion and Belonging, to engage, network and support each other in the field of Organic Chemistry
 Provide support and guidance to graduate students and post-docs making career decisions
 Provide community support to enhance retention of women in chemistry.

History 
The number of female scientists in the organic chemistry community, industry and academics, remains low (<20%). Advancement of women in the chemical sciences is a challenge due to the so-called “leaky pipeline,” wherein growing numbers of women enter academics and industry to study science opt out to pursue alternative careers, some of which are congruent with science while others are outside the discipline altogether. Inspired by the Grace Hopper Celebration of Women in Computing series of Conferences to encourage women to participate in computer science, gender diversity should be a goal across our community and we should actively be looking for opportunities to recognize, identify and retain women in the field of organic chemistry regardless of gender or any other protected characteristic.

To accomplish this goal a group of scientists (Lara Kallander, Donna Huryn, Ellie Cantor, Rebecca Ruck, Margaret Faul and Mary Watson) founded the non-profit Empowering Women in Organic Chemistry (EWOC) Conferences in 2019.  The volunteer-run EWOC conferences allow women leaders to present their scientific research and also allows the participants to hear career stories of how eminent women in the field of organic chemistry have developed their careers and the challenges they have faced – and overcome – along the way. The meeting consists of both science and career topics to provide support and guidance for the next generation of women chemists, as well as provide opportunities for professionals to learn up-to-date science, network and share experiences.  

Since 2021, various regional chapters of EWOC chapters have been launched, featuring virtual symposia and other events.

Conference Structure 
The EWOC Conference structure consists of a combination of scientific presentations, workshops, topical networking sessions, career panel and also includes a poster session. Examples of  Workshops have included Cultivate Belonging in the Workplace for Yourself and Others; How to Create, Build and Leverage Networks for Sustained Leadership and Career Success and Cultural Change to Enable Diversity & Inclusion, the Psychology of Selves: Beyond Imposter Syndrome, Leading through Influence, Allies Help Turn the Tide, Take Control of Your Time: Say No, Negotiate, Delegate, Beyond Pajamas: Coming out of COVID Isolation Mindfully, Beyond Pajamas: Coming out of COVID Isolation Mindfully, and a Discussion Toward Diversity, Equity and Inclusion in Organic Chemistry.  Examples of topical networking sessions have focused on Work/Life Balance Discussion, How to start an EWOC Chapter, Publishing like a Boss, Creating a Culture of Safety, Interviewing and choosing a company, and various peer networking discussions for graduate students, postdocs, early career faculty, LGBTQ+, Black, Indigenous, & People of Color (BIPOC), and Allies and Advocates, among others.  The virtual format of EWOC has been cited as an example of the benefits of virtual conferences because they are "more accessible to people who couldn’t otherwise attend because of travel costs or restrictions or because they have family obligations that make travel onerous."

List of EWOC Conferences

2019 Meeting and Speakers 
The first Empowering Women in Organic Chemistry Conference took place on Friday, June 28, 2019, at the University of Pennsylvania, Philadelphia, PA.

2019 Career Panel featured Sarah Wengryniuk (Temple University), Emily McLaughlin (Bard College), Nikki Goodwin (GlaxoSmithKline), Jamie McCabe Dunn (Merck), Zhenzhen Dong (Adesis), Nicole Camasso (JACS).

2020 Meeting and Speakers 
The second annual Empowering Women in Organic Chemistry Conference was held virtually on Thursday, August 13, 2020, and Friday, August 14, 2020.

2020 Career Panel featured Shanina Sanders Johnson (Spelman College), Davita Watkins (Univ of Mississippi), Niki Patel (Merck), Stacy Fosu (Abbvie), Beth Lorsbach (Corteva Agriscience), Sibrina Collins (Marburger STEM Center, Lawrence Technological University), Shana Cyr (Bristol Myers Squibb), Sherri Pietranico-Cole (Novartis),  Gabby Nepomuceno (California Department of Toxic Substances Control).

2021 Meeting and Speakers 
The third annual Empowering Women in Organic Chemistry Conference was held virtually on Thursday, June 24, and Friday, June 25, 2021.

2021 Career Panel featured Kay Brummond (Univ of Pittsburgh), Martha A. Sarpong (GlaxoSmithKline), Emma Radoux (Royal Society of Chemistry), Callie Bryan (Janssen), Kimberly Steward (Cargill) and Daisy Rosas Vargas (Ithaca College).

2022 Meeting and Speakers 
The fourth annual Empowering Women in Organic Chemistry Conference was a hybrid meeting on Thursday, June 23, and Friday, June 24, 2022.

References

Organic chemistry
Women in science and technology